Denys Vasilyev (born 8 May 1987) is a Ukrainian professional footballer who plays as a centre back.

Career
Vasilyev is a product of FC Knyazhe Schaslyve and RVUFK Kyiv Youth Sportive Schools.

After playing for Ukrainian clubs in the different levels, in June 2014 he signed a contract with Kazakhstani FC Taraz from the Kazakhstan Premier League.

He played for Ukrainian Naftovyk-Ukrnafta Okhtyrka from the Ukrainian First League.

References

External links
Profile at FFU Official Site (Ukr)

1987 births
Living people
Ukrainian footballers
FC Naftovyk-Ukrnafta Okhtyrka players
FC CSKA Kyiv players
FC Obolon-Brovar Kyiv players
FC Kryvbas Kryvyi Rih players
FC Taraz players
FC Helios Kharkiv players
FC Vereya players
FC Chornomorets Odesa players
FC Sioni Bolnisi players
FK Mash'al Mubarek players
Ukrainian First League players
Ukrainian Premier League players
First Professional Football League (Bulgaria) players
Kazakhstan Premier League players
Erovnuli Liga players
Azerbaijan Premier League players
Association football defenders
Ukrainian expatriate footballers
Expatriate footballers in Uzbekistan
Expatriate footballers in Georgia (country)
Expatriate footballers in Kazakhstan
Expatriate footballers in Bulgaria
Ukrainian expatriate sportspeople in Uzbekistan
Ukrainian expatriate sportspeople in Georgia (country)
Ukrainian expatriate sportspeople in Kazakhstan
Ukrainian expatriate sportspeople in Bulgaria
Sportspeople from Chernihiv Oblast